Warrego is an electoral district of the Legislative Assembly in the Australian state of Queensland.

The electorate lies in the extreme southwest of Queensland, running along the western part of the border with New South Wales. It includes the large town of Dalby, as well as the rural centres of Surat, Roma, Tara, Charleville, Augathella, St George and Cunnamulla.

History
The electoral district of Warrego was created by the Additional Members Act of 1864 which introduced six new single-member electorates. A by-election was held to fill the seat. The nomination date was 18 March 1865 and the election was held on 25 March 1865.

Warrego was, as with the rest of the state, held by independents and loose groupings of members around the government of the day until the first years of the twentieth century, when the partisan system took hold. It then became a stronghold of the centre-left Labor Party, which held it without interruption from 1908 to 1974. The decline of the rural working class gradually changed the demographics of the electorate, however, and it fell to the conservative National Party in 1974, at the height of the popularity of the Bjelke-Petersen government. The National Party significantly increased its hold on the electorate thereafter, and it is today one of the party's safest seats. The current member, Ann Leahy, has held the seat since 2015.

Members for Warrego

Election results

References

External links
 

Warrego